Senator Ellsworth may refer to:

Harris Ellsworth (1899–1986), Oregon State Senate
Oliver Ellsworth (1745–1807),  U.S. Senator from Connecticut from 1789 to 1796
Stukely Ellsworth (1769–1837), New York State Senate
Timothy E. Ellsworth (1836–1904), New York State Senate